The  (from French: Annals of Pure and Applied Mathematics), commonly known as the  (Annals of Gergonne), was a mathematical journal published in Nimes, France from 1810 to 1831 by Joseph Diez Gergonne. The annals were largely devoted to geometry, with additional articles on history, philosophy, and mathematics education showing interdisciplinarity.

New symbols and new terms to enrich mathematical literature are found here for the first time. The journal, which met with instant approval, became a model for many another editor. Cauchy, Poncelet, Brianchon, Steiner, Plücker, Crelle, Poisson, Ampere, Chasles, and Liouville sent articles for publication."

Operational calculus was developed in the journal in 1814 by Francois-Joseph Servois.

The reference to both pure mathematics and applied mathematics in the journal title inspired replications in later journals:
  started in 1836 by Joseph Liouville
 , commonly known as Crelle's Journal
 The Quarterly Journal of Pure and Applied Mathematics, title adopted by Cambridge in 1855
 Annali di Matematica Pura ed Applicata, the first Italian periodical, title adopted in 1858 
 Communications on Pure and Applied Mathematics, adopted 1959 at Courant Institute
 Journal of Pure and Applied Algebra from 1971

References

External links
 Archive Tome 1 to Tome 22 from NUMDAM (Numerisation de documents anciens mathematiques) at CNRS

Mathematics journals
French-language journals
Defunct journals
Publications established in 1810
Monthly journals
Publications disestablished in 1822